Opilio Rossi (14 May 1910 – 9 February 2004) was a cardinal of the Roman Catholic Church and president of the Pontifical Council for the Laity.

Early life and priesthood
He was born in New York, the son of Angelo Rossi and Davidina Ciappa. The family moved to Italy when he was a young boy.

He was educated at the Collegio Alberoni in Piacenza and later the Pontifical Roman Athenaeum "S. Apollinare" in Rome where he earned a doctorate in canon law with a thesis on St. Basil.

He was ordained on 11 March 1933 in Rome. He was incardinated in diocese of Piacenza. He served as an attaché at Vatican Secretariat of State from 1937 until 1938. He was created Privy chamberlain supernumerary on 1 September 1938. He was attached to the diplomatic corps serving as the secretary of the nunciature in Belgium from 1938 until 1939 and in the Netherlands from 1939 to 1940. He was promoted to the Auditor of the nunciature in Germany from 1940 until 1945 and served in the same position in the Netherlands from 1945 to 1948. After World War II he was a counselor of the nunciature in Germany from 1951 until 1953.

Episcopate
He was appointed titular archbishop of Ancyra and appointed nuncio to Ecuador on 21 November 1953 by Pope Pius XII. He was consecrated on 27 December 1953. He was transferred to the nunciature in Chile on 25 March 1959 and again to Austria on 25 September 1961. He attended the Second Vatican Council from 1962 until the close of the council in 1965.

Cardinalate
He was created Cardinal Deacon of S. Maria Liberatrice a Monte Testaccio by Pope Paul VI in the consistory of 24 May 1976. He was appointed as President of the Pontifical Council for the Laity on 20 December 1976. He took part in the conclaves that elected Pope John Paul I and Pope John Paul II in August 1978 and October 1978. He resigned the presidency of the Pontifical Council for the Laity on 8 April 1984 and was succeeded by Cardinal Eduardo Pironio.

He was Cardinal protodeacon (that is the longest serving Cardinal-Deacon) from 2 February 1983 until 22 June 1987.
  
He opted for the order of cardinal priests after being ten years as a cardinal deacon and received the title of San Lorenzo in Lucina on 22 June 1987. He lost the right to participate in a conclave when turned 80 years of age in 1990.

Death
He died in 2004, at the Domus Internationalis Paulus VI in Rome. He is buried at the chapel of Madonna di Lourdes, parish church of Scopolo, diocese of Piacenza-Bobbio, where he used to pray as a child.

External links
 http://www.catholic-hierarchy.org/bishop/brossio.html 

 https://www.vatican.va/content/john-paul-ii/de/homilies/2004/documents/hf_jp-ii_hom_20040213_card-opilio-rossi.html

20th-century Italian cardinals
Participants in the Second Vatican Council
Apostolic Nuncios to Ecuador
Apostolic Nuncios to Austria
Apostolic Nuncios to Chile
Protodeacons
1910 births
2004 deaths
Pontifical Ecclesiastical Academy alumni
Pontifical Council for the Laity
Cardinals created by Pope Paul VI
Commanders Crosses of the Order of Merit of the Federal Republic of Germany